Helena Dix (born 26 May 1979) is an Australian operatic soprano and specialist in bel canto roles. In 2005 Dix represented Australia in BBC Cardiff Singer of the World. She was awarded as an associate of The Royal Academy of Music in 2015 for her significant contribution to the music industry.

Early life and education 
Dix was born in Melbourne, Australia. She attended Caulfield Grammar School and gained a scholarship to Melba Memorial Conservatorium of Music, where she studied with her first teacher Margaret Nisbett OBE. She went on to do a postgraduate diploma in opera at the Royal Academy of Music in London, where she held an ABRSM scholarship and studied with Elizabeth Ritchie.

Career 
Dix's operatic repertoire includes the title role in Cristina Regina di Svezia for Wexford Festival Opera, Oldenburgisches Staatstheater and Chelsea Opera Group. Elettra in Idomeneo and Odabella in Attila for Staatstheatrer Nurnberg and Theatre Lubreck. Gioconda in La Gioconda for Proyecto Ópera Universidad de Valladolid, Flowermaiden in Parsifal for English National Opera, Elvira (cover) in Ernani for The Metropolitan Opera, Isabella in Das Liebesverbot for Chelsea Opera Group. Rosalinde in Die Fledermaus and Hanna Glawari in The Merry Widow for Scottish Opera where she has also covered Frasquita in Carmen and Karolina in The Two Widows. Also, Fiordiligi in Cosi fan tutte, Donna Anna in Don Giovanni, Contessa in Le Nozze di Figaro and Nella in Gianni Schicchi for The Opera Project.

In 2014 Dix was nominated in the Best Young Singer category in The International Opera Awards.

Dix returned to Australia to star in her first staged Wagner role Elsa in Lohengrin and also appeared in a production of Roberto Devereux by Melbourne Opera.

In April 2020, Dix contracted COVID-19 which developed complications which required her to be hospitalised.

Critical reception 
Her portrayal of Queen Elizabeth in Roberto Devereux received positive reviews. Rob Holdsworth wrote that she was "The most exciting voice since Sutherland" and  The Age wrote:

The Arts Desk praised her performance in Das Liebesverbot:

Her portrayal of Lady Macbeth in Verdi's Macbeth was highly praised by Cassidy Knowlton of Time Out Melbourne, who said:

References

External links 
 Helena Dix | Official Website

Australian operatic sopranos
Musicians from Melbourne
1979 births
Living people
21st-century Australian singers
21st-century Australian women singers